Graig Newman (born July 2, 1989) is a Canadian former professional football defensive back for the Saskatchewan Roughriders of the Canadian Football League (CFL). He was invited to the Roughriders' 2011 training camp on May 17, 2011, and spent time on the team's practice roster during the 2011 season. Following the completion of his junior career, Newman signed with Saskatchewan on December 11, 2011. He played for two years with the Winnipeg Blue Bombers before re-signing with the Roughriders on February 9, 2016. He announced his retirement on March 20, 2017.

Newman played junior football for the Saskatoon Hilltops of the Canadian Junior Football League.

References

External links 
 Saskatchewan Roughriders bio 
 Winnipeg Blue Bombers bio

1989 births
Living people
Canadian football defensive backs
People from Langley, British Columbia (district municipality)
Players of Canadian football from British Columbia
Saskatchewan Roughriders players
Canadian Junior Football League players
Winnipeg Blue Bombers players